Park Yoon-jae (born January 14, 1981) is a South Korean actor. He is best known for starring in the television series Indomitable Daughters-in-Law (2011), Your Lady (2013), and Shining Romance (2013).

Filmography

Television series

Film

Awards and nominations

References

External links

21st-century South Korean male actors
South Korean male television actors
South Korean male film actors
1981 births
Living people
Place of birth missing (living people)
South Korean Buddhists